The Rondo in E-flat major, Op. 16, sometimes called Introduction and Rondo, is a classical composition by Frédéric Chopin, written in 1833.  It was dedicated to Caroline Hartmann.

Analysis
The piece is written in rondo form. It begins with a passionate introduction in C minor, followed by the joyful main theme in E-flat major. The second theme is still lively, but somewhat more subdued than the first. To conclude, the main theme returns, followed by the coda. The piece as a whole is varied and interesting, but challenging for the pianist. The average performance of this piece lasts around 10 minutes.

References

External links
 

Compositions by Frédéric Chopin
1833 compositions

Compositions in E-flat major